Leeds Tramways Company operated a tramway service in Leeds between 1871 and 1894.

History

The Leeds Tramways Order of 1871 authorised the Leeds Tramways Company to construct tramway lines in Leeds. The first route opened on 16 September 1871 from Boar Lane to Oak Inn, Headingley.

A successful experiment with steam traction took place in 1882, and from this time onwards until the end of services the company operated a mixture of horse drawn and steam services.

William Turton

William Turton pioneered the use of horse-drawn tramways and was the founding director of the company.

Closure

Leeds Corporation purchased the tramway company in 1893 for the sum of £112,225 with the aim of modernising it and extending it, which it did under the control of Leeds Corporation Tramways. It took direct control of operations in 1894.

See also
Leeds Tramway
Leeds Supertram
Trolleybuses in Leeds
Transport in Leeds
History of Leeds

References

Tram transport in England
Rail transport in West Yorkshire
Transport in Leeds
Leeds Blue Plaques